Oliver Källbom (born May 9, 1995) is a Swedish ice hockey goaltender. He is currently playing with Linköpings HC of the Swedish Hockey League (SHL).

Källbom made his debut with Linköpings HC during the 2013 European Trophy.

References

External links

1995 births
Living people
Linköping HC players
Swedish ice hockey goaltenders